Humberto Leon (born June 7, 1975) is an American fashion designer, retailer and creative director, working in partnership with Carol Lim.

Leon and Lim founded the fashion retailer Opening Ceremony in 2002 in Lower Manhattan. Further stores followed in New York City, Los Angeles, and Tokyo. An Opening Ceremony store opened in 2012 in London, coinciding with the Olympics.

In 2011, Lim and Leon were announced as creative directors of the French high fashion brand Kenzo, which was founded in 1970 and is part of the LVMH luxury goods conglomerate until their departure in July 2019.

Early life 
Born to a Peruvian father and Chinese seamstress mother, Leon grew up in the suburbs of Los Angeles as the youngest in a tight-knit family.

Early career 
After completing graduation, Leon worked in the corporate sector for a decade, serving as design director at American clothing retailer Gap. Consequently, he worked at Burberry, during the start of its renaissance under the administration of Rose Marie Bravo.

Career 
In early 2001, at age 25, Lim and Leon went on a two-week trip to Hong Kong. There, they were inspired to open a store in the United States upon their return. Its concept was to bring brands such as Havaianas and Topshop to the United States and to feature emerging American fashion brands such as Proenza Schouler, Alexander Wang, and Rodarte. After considering various names (including Airport and Terminal), the two founders finally settled upon Opening Ceremony. Leon and Lim went to the New York State Small Business Development Center at SUNY for assistance in refining their business plan and obtaining a business loan, and each contributed $10,000 of their own money towards Opening Ceremony.

In July 2011, Kenzo parent company LVMH announced the appointment of Humberto Leon as co-co-creative director of the brand. Leon and Lim's debut collection was in 2012. The first collection was inspired by upstate New York and the painter Ellsworth Kelly. Lim and Leon are credited with reinventing the label—which had been in steady decline since Kenzo Takada's departure in 1999—by injecting a youthful exuberance and sensibility into its clothing. Their modern approach to design and communications has paved the way for the brand's revival in recent years.

Leon was a member of the Council of Fashion Designers of America and an advisor to Parsons School of Design. 

Leon and Lim departed from their role at Kenzo in June 2019 to focus on Opening Ceremony .

See also
 Chinese people in New York City
 LGBT culture in New York City
 List of LGBT people from New York City

References

American fashion designers
American company founders
1975 births
Living people
California people in fashion
LGBT fashion designers
American LGBT businesspeople
American fashion designers of Chinese descent
American people of Peruvian descent
Artists from Los Angeles
LGBT people from California
LVMH people
University of California, Berkeley alumni
21st-century American businesspeople
Creative directors